Steve Stanko (September 5, 1917 – December 31, 1978) was an American heavyweight weightlifter and bodybuilder. In weightlifting he won a silver medal at the 1938 World Championships and set three unofficial world records in 1941: in the snatch, clean and jerk and in the total. In bodybuilding he was crowned Mr. America in 1944, Most Muscular Man in America in 1946, and Mr. Universe in 1947.

Stanko grew up in Perth Amboy, New Jersey and was spotted by Bob Hoffman, who convinced Stanko to move to York, Pennsylvania to work at York Barbell and develop his physique.

References

1917 births
1978 deaths
American male weightlifters
American bodybuilders
People associated with physical culture
Sportspeople from Perth Amboy, New Jersey
World Weightlifting Championships medalists
20th-century American people